This is a list of Turkish television related events from 2014.

Events
20 January - Hasan Doğru wins the third season of O Ses Türkiye.
29 February - Illusionists Burak & Kıvanç win the fifth season of Yetenek Sizsiniz Türkiye.
19 July - Halil Polat wins the first season of X Factor.

Debuts

Television shows
O Ses Türkiye (2011–present)

Ending this year

Births

Deaths

See also
2014 in Turkey

References